The old 2nd tier in the Bolivian Football pyramid consists of 9 regional leagues (one for each department), the number of participants varies depending on the department, It usually has between 8 and 12 teams. Both winner and runner-up of each league compete in the Copa Simón Bolívar, with the winner of such tournament gaining promotion to the 1st Division, and the runner-up playing a play-off match with the 11th placed team in the 1st Division. Until 1976 all 8 regional championships (Pando didn't have an organized tournament back then) were the top in the national football pyramid, with the winner of the Copa Simón Bolívar being crowned as national champion. In 2011, and for five seasons, the Copa Simón Bolívar was replaced by the Liga Nacional B, until 2016 when it was reinstated as Bolivia's second-tier football championship.

The oldest regional championship is the one played in La Paz, it started in 1914 and it was considered for many years as the top Bolivian league, even more when it turned into a semi-pro tournament in 1950 and started including teams from Oruro and Cochabamba.

Copa Simón Bolívar 
The tournament started in 1960, initially only champions from La Paz, Cochabamba, Oruro and Santa Cruz participated, on later years teams from other associations started joining the cup, and the tournament eventually had also runner-up's participating.

Until 1976, due to the lack of a nationwide league, the cup determined the national champion and representative teams for the Copa Libertadores.  With the creation of the Liga de Fútbol Profesional Boliviano, the Bolivian FA stopped organizing the tournament.

Finally in 1989 the tournament was resurrected, with the same format of having both champions and runner-up from each association, but this time each regional league was the 2nd tier on the football pyramid so the champion was supposed to be awarded a place in the professional league. Previously the last placed team in the 1st division was replaced by the regional champion of its departament. However that practice was kept until 1993 when finally the champion was awarded a spot in the top league.

The competition format changes frequently, in 2008, the team were divided in 3 groups of 6 teams each, to save costs, geographically close teams were teamed up and played on a home-away round-robin basis, with group 1 consisting of teams from La Paz, Oruro and Cochabamba; group 2 with teams from Potosí, Chuquisaca and Tarija, and group 3 with teams from Santa Cruz, Beni and Pando.  The top 2 placed teams advanced to the next round, now playing play-offs on home-away basis, the 3 winners and the best loser advanced to the semifinals and then the final.

List of Champions

Torneo Nacional 
As First Division Tournament

Copa Simón Bolívar 
As First Division Tournament

As Second Division Tournament

 Note that:
NB: Enrique Happ (full name Escuela Enrique Happ) from Cochabamba were never promoted to the first division in spite of winning the cup three time, apparently because they are a special footballing school (like the better known Academia Tahuichi in Santa Cruz).

References

External links

 
Simón